Spirama capitulifera is a species of moth of the family Erebidae. It is found in Indonesia (Moluccas, Sulawesi).

References

Moths described in 1919
Spirama
Moths of Indonesia